Péter Bácsalmási (6 November 1908 – 20 May 1981) was a Hungarian athlete. He competed at the 1932 Summer Olympics and the 1936 Summer Olympics.

References

1908 births
1981 deaths
Athletes (track and field) at the 1932 Summer Olympics
Athletes (track and field) at the 1936 Summer Olympics
Hungarian male triple jumpers
Hungarian male pole vaulters
Hungarian decathletes
Olympic athletes of Hungary
Place of birth missing